Abdelhakim Serrar (born 24 April 1961 in Sétif) is an Algerian former professional football player who won the African Nations Cup in 1990 and is one of a few that won the Afro-Asian Cup for both club and country. Serrar played as a central defender throughout his career for Entente sportive de Sétif. He is currently the president of ES Sétif, and since his presidency the club has been arguably one of the best teams in the division, if not the best. He retired from football on 1 July 1991 at the age of 30.

Presidency
He sacked coach Azzedine Aït Djoudi immediately after the end of the game between ES Sétif and ES Tunis due to the elimination of the club in the second leg of the semi-final of the Arab Champions League played in Rades Stadium.

Zekri was sacked from his managerial position at ES Sétif on 18 August 2010, due to the poor results gained at the 2010 CAF Champions League group stage. The 1–0 loss against Zimbabwe side Dynamos was the final straw for Abdelhakim Serrar.

On 19 August 2010, Abdelhakim Serrar mentioned that former Italian physical trainer Gianni Solinas is likely to become head coach of ES Sétif.

Honours
As a player:
Champion from Algeria in 1987
Vice Champion of Algeria in 1986
Winner of the Cup of Algeria in 1989
Winner of the Champions League CAF in 1988
Winner of the Afro-Asian Cup in 1989
Won the African Cup of Nations in 1990
Winner of the Afro-Asian Cup in 1991

As president of ES Setif :
Champion from Algeria in 2007 and 2009
Winner Cup of Algeria in 2010 and 2012
Runners Supercup Algeria in 2007
Won the Arab Champions League in 2007 and 2008
Finalist in the CAF Cup in 2009
Winner of the Coupe North African club champions in 2009

References

External links
stats 

1961 births
Living people
Algerian footballers
ES Sétif players
Competitors at the 1987 Mediterranean Games
Algeria international footballers
1990 African Cup of Nations players
Footballers from Sétif
Algeria under-23 international footballers
Africa Cup of Nations-winning players
Association football defenders
Mediterranean Games competitors for Algeria
21st-century Algerian people
20th-century Algerian people